The Rhode Island Urban Debate League (RIUDL) is an American urban debate league located in Rhode Island. It operates as a community partnership program between Brown University's Howard R. Swearer Center for Public Service and the Rhode Island high schools with which RIUDL is affiliated.

History
The League was founded in 1999 as the Providence Urban Debate League (PUDL), so named as it served high schools solely in the city of Providence. In 2003, PUDL was renamed the Rhode Island Urban Debate League (RIUDL) as a response to the expanding mission of the League and the addition of Woonsocket High School in Woonsocket, Rhode Island in 2002. For the 2009-2010 season, four new schools were added, including: Alvarez High School, Cooley High School, E-Cubed Academy, and PAIS High School. For the 2011-2012 season, Paul Cuffee High School joined the league.

Member Schools

Alvarez High School
Central Falls High School
Central High School
Classical High School
W. M. Davies Career and Technical High School (Davies)
Educational Excellence through Empowerment (E-Cubed) Academy
Hope High School
The Juanita Sánchez Educational Complex
La Salle Academy
Mt. Pleasant High School
Paul Cuffee High School, Providence
Shea High School, Providence
Woonsocket High School

9th Anniversary Banquet
RIUDL celebrated the close of the 2007-2008 debate season with a commemoration of its founding 9 years prior. In attendance were David Cicilline, Mayor of Providence, and Nate Parker, one of the actors from The Great Debaters.

11th Anniversary Banquet
RIUDL celebrated the close of the 2009-2010 debate season with a banquet at Brown University. In attendance were David Cicilline, Mayor of Providence and keynote speaker, United States Senator Jack Reed, D-Rhode Island.

See also
Competitive debate in the United States

External links
The Swearer Center's website section on RIUDL
Program listing on the Swearer Center Opportunities website
The History of the Urban Debate Network
RIUDL Blog through the Social Innovation Initiative

References

1999 establishments in Rhode Island
Student debating societies
Youth organizations based in Rhode Island
Urban debate leagues